Fossavatnsgangan is an annual ski marathon held in Ísafjörður, in the Westfjords of Iceland. The event has been a part of Worldloppet since 2014.

It is the oldest ski race in Iceland, held since 1935. Although it was cancelled several times in the 1940s and 1950s, the race has been held every year since 1956.

Initially a 20 km race, a shorter distance of 10 km was added in 1987, and in 1989 a 7 kilometre course followed to attract children and beginners. The currently longest race over the distance of 50 km has only been held since 2004 and due to its challenges and difficulties has increasingly attracted international professional skiers, particularly Norwegians. In 2005 this 50 km marathon was added to the FIS, and that same year Fossavatn became a founding partner of the FIS Nordic Ski Marathon Cup, a series which includes the Holmenkollen Skimaraton in Norway, Tornedalsloppet in Sweden, Oulun Tervahiihto in Finland and the Fossavatn Ski Marathon in Iceland.

The most successful athlete of the marathon since its inception in 1935 is a local skier named Kristján Rafn Gudmundsson, 12 times winner of the Fossavatn Ski Marathon in the 1960s and 1970s. The most prolific competitor is another local named Sigurður Jónsson who first competed in 1938.

Winners

Men

Women

References

External links

Official site

1935 establishments in Iceland
April sporting events
FIS Nordic Ski Marathon Cup
Ísafjörður
May sporting events
Recurring sporting events established in 1935
Ski marathons
Skiing competitions in Iceland
Skiing in Iceland